Pablo Daniel Lyle López (born November 18, 1986) is a Mexican actor.

Career 
After graduating from a Catholic school in his hometown, he started his career in modeling. In 2005, he started acting. His breakout role was in La Sombra del Pasado as the male lead protagonist. In 2015 Lyle was voted "Los 50 Más Bellos" ("50 Most Beautiful") by People en Español.

Manslaughter charges 
In April 2019, Lyle admitted to punching 63-year-old Juan Ricardo Hernández (of Cuban origin) in the face during a road rage incident in Miami, Florida. The victim was hospitalized and died four days after the attack. Lyle was charged with manslaughter after the elderly man died. He had been originally charged with battery before Hernández died. There is a video of the incident in which Lyle is seen running to punch Hernández. Lyle was convicted in October 2022. Lyle was sentenced to 5 years in state prison and 8 years probation in February 2023.

Filmography

References

External links 
 

1986 births
Living people
21st-century Mexican male actors
Mexican male telenovela actors
People from Mazatlán
Male actors from Sinaloa